Randy Rasmussen may refer to:

Randy Rasmussen (American football, born 1945), American football player
Randy Rasmussen (American football, born 1960), American football player

See Also
Randy, people with the given name Randy
Randy (disambiguation), a disambiguation page for Randy